Princess Elisabeth of Thurn and Taxis (German: Elisabeth Maria Maximiliana; 28 May 1860 – 7 February 1881) was the Duchess of Braganza and wife of Miguel, Duke of Braganza.

Life
Elisabeth was a Princess of Thurn and Taxis by birth and an Infanta of Portugal, Princess of Braganza, and titular Queen consort of Portugal through her marriage to Miguel, Duke of Braganza, Miguelist claimant to the throne of Portugal from 1866 to 1920.

Elisabeth was the second eldest child and daughter of Maximilian Anton Lamoral, Hereditary Prince of Thurn and Taxis and his wife Duchess Helene in Bavaria.

Marriage and issue

Elisabeth married Miguel, Duke of Braganza, only son and second eldest child of Miguel I of Portugal and his wife Adelaide of Löwenstein-Wertheim-Rosenberg, on 17 October 1877 in Regensburg, Kingdom of Bavaria.

Elisabeth and Miguel had three children:

 Dom Miguel de Bragança, Duke of Viseu (1878–1923), married Anita Stewart
 Dom Francisco José de Bragança (1879–1919)
 Dona Maria Teresa de Bragança (1881–1945), married Prince Karl Ludwig of Thurn and Taxis

The couple moved to Austria, where on 22 September 1878 in Reichenau an der Rax, her first son, Miguel Maximiliano, was born. It was after this birth that Elisabeth's health began to deteriorate. Elisabeth died at the age of 20 in Ödenburg shortly after the birth of her third child, Maria Teresa.

Elisabeth's mother Helene withdrew after her death more and more from public life. Her husband Miguel eventually remarried on 8 November 1893 in Kleinheubach to Princess Maria Theresa of Löwenstein-Wertheim-Rosenberg.

Ancestry

References

Manuel de Mello Corrêa (eds): Anuário since Nobreza de Portugal. Instituto Português de Heráldica, Lisboa, 1985.

1860 births
1881 deaths
Duchesses of Braganza
Portuguese infantas
Nobility from Dresden
Princesses of Thurn und Taxis
Deaths in childbirth